The 2012–13 Florida Panthers season was the 20th season for the National Hockey League (NHL) franchise that was established on June 14, 1993. The season was partially cancelled due to a lockout, which ended on January 6, 2013. The campaign for the Panthers then commenced as a shortened, 48-game season beginning on January 19.  The shortened season would feature only intra-conference games.

The Panthers were eliminated from Stanley Cup playoff contention, failing to make the playoffs for the 11th time in their past 12 seasons. Florida earned the fewest points of any NHL team in 2012–13, finishing with a 15–27–6 record for last in both the Eastern Conference and 30-team NHL.

Off-season

Pre-season
A pre-season schedule was planned for late September and early October, but the lockout forced its cancellation. No pre-season will be held for the truncated, 48-game campaign beginning January 19.

Regular season
As of Thursday, October 4, the NHL has cancelled all games scheduled through Wednesday, October 24, causing the Panthers to lose their first five games of the season, with more cancelled games possible without a resolution to the dispute soon.  As of Friday, October 19, the Panthers have lost three additional games through November 1 due to the lockout.  All November games were lost one week later on Friday, October 26, eliminating any possibility of a rearranged 82-game season and assuring that any season that does take place will be shortened.  On November 23, two more weeks of hockey and six additional Panthers games were put on the chopping block, with all matchups through December 14 being cancelled.  On December 11, after a week of negotiations broke off, all games through December 30 were axed.  On December 20, 2012, following a further lack of negotiations during the lockout, all games through January 14 were cancelled.

On January 6, 2013, the lockout ended after a 16-hour negotiation session in an effort to salvage the season.  A condensed season, of a length of 48 intra-conference games, will now be played.

The Panthers scored 109 goals (excluding three shootout-winning goals) over the lockout-shortened season of 48 games, tied for 29th overall with the Nashville Predators. They also allowed 170 goals (excluding one shootout goal), the most in the League, allowed the most power-play goals, with 39, and had the lowest penalty-kill percentage, at 74.17%.

Standings

Schedule and results
Below is the new, truncated 2012–13 schedule for the Panthers, who will open the season on Saturday, January 19 against the Hurricanes, closing on Saturday, April 27 against the Tampa Bay Lightning.

|- style="text-align:center; background:#cfc;"
| 1 || January 19 || Carolina || 1–5 || Florida ||  || Theodore (1–0–0) || Ward (0–1–0) || 19,688 || 1–0–0 || 2 || Recap
|- style="text-align:center; background:#fcf;"
| 2 || January 21 || Florida || 0–4 || Ottawa ||  || Anderson (2–0–0) || Theodore (1–1–0) || 19,952 || 1–1–0 || 2 || Recap
|- style="text-align:center; background:#fcf;"
| 3 || January 22 || Florida || 1–4 || Montreal ||  || Price (1–1–0) || Clemmensen (0–1–0) || 21,273 || 1–2–0 || 2 || Recap
|- style="text-align:center; background:#fcf;"
| 4 || January 24 || Ottawa || 3–1 || Florida ||  || Anderson (3–0–0) || Theodore (1–2–0) || 15,634 || 1–3–0 || 2 || Recap
|- style="text-align:center; background:#fcf;"
| 5 || January 26 || Philadelphia || 7–1 || Florida ||  || Bryzgalov (2–3–0) || Theodore (1–3–0) || 19,311 || 1–4–0 || 2 || Recap
|- style="text-align:center; background:#fcf;"
| 6 || January 29 || Florida || 2–5 || Tampa Bay ||  || Lindback (4–1–0) || Theodore (1–4–0) || 19,204 || 1–5–0 || 2 || Recap
|- style="text-align:center; background:#cfc;"
| 7 || January 31 || Winnipeg || 3–6 || Florida || ||  Theodore (2–4–0) || Pavelec (2–3–1) || 15,731 || 2–5–0 || 4 || Recap
|-

|- style="text-align:center; background:#cfc;"
| 8 || February 3 || Florida || 4–3 || Buffalo ||  || Theodore (3–4–0) || Miller (3–4–1) || 18,831 || 3–5–0 || 6 ||  Recap
|- style="text-align:center; background:#ffc;"
| 9 || February 5 || Florida || 2–3 || Winnipeg || OT || Pavelec (3–4–1) || Clemmensen (0–1–1) || 15,004 || 3–5–1 || 7 || Recap
|- style="text-align:center; background:#cfc;"
| 10 || February 7 || Florida || 3–2 || Philadelphia || SO || Theodore (4–4–0) || Bryzgalov (4–5–1) || 19,616 || 4–5–1 || 9 || Recap
|- style="text-align:center; background:#fcf;"
| 11 || February 9 || Florida || 0–5 || Washington ||  || Holtby (2–4–0) || Theodore (4–5–0) || 18,506 || 4–6–1 || 9 || Recap 
|- style="text-align:center; background:#ffc;"
| 12 || February 12 || Washington || 6–5 || Florida || OT || Holtby (3–4–0) || Clemmensen (0–1–2) || 15,340 || 4–6–2 || 10 || Recap
|- style="text-align:center; background:#ffc;"
| 13 || February 14 || Montreal || 1–0 || Florida || OT || Price (8–3–0) || Theodore (4–5–1) || 17,021 || 4–6–3 || 11 || Recap
|- style="text-align:center; background:#ffc;"
| 14 || February 16 || Tampa Bay || 6–5 || Florida || OT || Lindback (6–3–1) || Theodore (4–5–2) || 17,009 || 4–6–4 || 12 || Recap
|- style="text-align:center; background:#fcf;"
| 15 || February 18 || Toronto || 3–0 ||  Florida ||  || Scrivens (4–3–0) || Theodore (4–6–2) || 17,177 || 4–7–4 || 12 || Recap
|- style="text-align:center; background:#cfc;"
| 16 || February 21 || Florida || 5–2 || Philadelphia ||  || Clemmensen (1–1–2) || Bryzgalov (8–8–1) || 19,605 || 5–7–4 || 14 || Recap
|- style="text-align:center; background:#fcf;"
| 17 || February 22 || Florida || 1–3 || Pittsburgh ||  || Fleury (9–3–0) || Markstrom (0–1–0) || 18,655 || 5–8–4 || 14 || Recap
|- style="text-align:center; background:#fcf;"
| 18 || February 24 || Boston || 4–1 || Florida ||  || Rask (9–1–2) || Markstrom (0–2–0) || 18,108 || 5–9–4 || 14 || Recap 
|- style="text-align:center; background:#cfc;"
| 19 || February 26 || Pittsburgh || 4–6 || Florida ||  || Clemmensen (2–1–2) || Fleury (10–4–0) || 17,378 || 6–9–4 || 16 || Recap  
|- style="text-align:center; background:#ffc;"
| 20 || February 28 || Buffalo || 4–3 || Florida || SO || Miller (8–10–1) || Theodore (4–6–3) || 15,672 || 6–9–5 || 17 || Recap 
|-

|- style="text-align:center; background:#fcf;"
| 21 || March 2 || Florida || 2–6 || Carolina ||  || Ward (8–6–1) || Clemmensen (2–2–2) || 18,680 || 6–10–5 || 17 || Recap
|- style="text-align:center; background:#fcf;"
| 22 || March 3 || Carolina || 3–2 || Florida ||  || Ward (9–6–1) || Clemmensen (2–3–2) || 15,978 || 6–11–5 || 17 || Recap  
|- style="text-align:center; background:#cfc;"
| 23 || March 5 || Winnipeg || 1–4 || Florida ||  || Markstrom (1–2–0) || Pavelec (8–11–1) || 14,574 || 7–11–5 || 19 || Recap 
|- style="text-align:center; background:#fcf;"
| 24 || March 7 || Florida || 1–7 || Washington ||  || Holtby (9–7–0) || Markstrom (1–3–0) || 18,506 || 7–12–5 || 19 || Recap 
|- style="text-align:center; background:#ffc;"
| 25 || March 8 || Winnipeg || 3–2 || Florida || OT || Pavelec (9–11–1) || Markstrom (1–3–1) || 16,442 || 7–12–6 || 20 || Recap 
|- style="text-align:center; background:#fcf;"
| 26 || March 10 || Montreal || 5–2 || Florida ||  || Budaj (4–1–1) || Markstrom (1–4–1) || 19,189 || 7–13–6 || 20 || Recap
|- style="text-align:center; background:#fcf;"
| 27 || March 12 || Tampa Bay || 3–2 || Florida ||  || Lindback (9–6–1) || Markstrom (1–5–1) || 15,174 || 7–14–6 || 20 || Recap
|- style="text-align:center; background:#fcf;"
| 28 || March 14 || Florida || 1–4 || Boston ||  || Rask (14–2–3) || Clemmensen (2–4–2) || 17,565 || 7–15–6 || 20 || Recap
|- style="text-align:center; background:#fcf;"
| 29 || March 16 || N.Y. Islanders || 4–3 || Florida ||  || Nabokov (13–8–3) || Clemmensen (2–5–2) || 17,627 || 7–16–6 || 20 || Recap 
|- style="text-align:center; background:#cfc;"
| 30 || March 19 || Florida || 4–1 || Carolina ||  || Markstrom (2–5–1) || Ellis (4–4–1) || 16,349 || 8–16–6 || 22 || Recap
|- style="text-align:center; background:#cfc;"
| 31 || March 21 || Florida || 3–1 || N.Y. Rangers ||  || Markstrom (3–5–1) || Lundqvist (13–12–1) || 17,200 || 9–16–6 || 24 || Recap 
|- style="text-align:center; background:#fcf;"
| 32 || March 23 || Florida || 1–2 || New Jersey ||  || Brodeur (10–2–3) || Clemmensen (2–6–2) || 17,625 || 9–17–6 || 24 || Recap
|- style="text-align:center; background:#fcf;"
| 33 || March 24 || Florida || 0–3 || N.Y. Islanders ||  || Nabokov (14–10–3) || Markstrom (3–6–1) || 14,512 || 9–18–6 || 24 ||  Recap
|- style="text-align:center; background:#fcf;"
| 34 || March 26 || Florida || 2–3 || Toronto ||  || Scrivens (7–8–0) || Markstrom (3–7–1) || 19,379 || 9–19–6 || 24 || Recap 
|- style="text-align:center; background:#cfc;"
| 35 || March 28 || Buffalo || 4–5 || Florida || SO || Markstrom (4–7–1) || Miller (11–14–5) || 17,044 || 10–19–6 || 26 || Recap 
|- style="text-align:center; background:#cfc;"
| 36 || March 30 || New Jersey || 2–3 || Florida || OT || Markstrom (5–7–1) || Brodeur (10–2–6) || 18,138 || 11–19–6 || 28 || Recap
|-

|- style="text-align:center; background:#cfc;"
| 37 || April 2 || Florida || 3–2 || Tampa Bay || SO || Markstrom (6–7–1) || Garon (5–8–1) || 17,904 || 12–19–6 || 30 || Recap
|- style="text-align:center; background:#fcf;"
| 38 || April 6 || Washington || 3–4 || Florida ||  ||  Holtby (17–11–1) || Markstrom (6–8–1) || 16,886 || 12–20–6 || 30 || Recap
|- style="text-align:center; background:#cfc;"
| 39 || April 7 || Ottawa || 1–2 || Florida ||  || Clemmensen (3–6–2) || Anderson (8–5–2) || 15,552 || 13–20–6 || 32 || Recap
|- style="text-align:center; background:#fcf;"
| 40 || April 11 || Florida || 2–7 || Winnipeg ||  || Pavelec (18–18–2) || Markstrom (6–9–1) || 15,004 || 13–21–6 || 32 || Recap
|- style="text-align:center; background:#fcf;"
| 41 || April 13 || Pittsburgh || 1–3 || Florida ||  || Fleury (21–6–0) || Markstrom (6–10–1) || 18,891 || 13–22–6 || 32 || Recap 
|- style="text-align:center; background:#fcf;"
| 42 || April 16 || Florida || 2–5 || N.Y. Islanders ||  || Nabokov (21–11–5) || Markstrom (6–11–1) || 15,922 || 13–23–6 || 32 || Recap 
|- style="text-align:center; background:#fcf;"
| 43 || April 18 || Florida || 1–6 || N.Y. Rangers ||  || Lundqvist (20–15–3) || Clemmensen (3–7–2) || 17,200 || 13–24–6 || 32 || Recap
|- style="text-align:center; background:#fcf;"
| 44 || April 20 || Florida || 2–6 || New Jersey ||  || Brodeur (12–8–7) || Markstrom (6–12–1) || 16,018 || 13–25–6 || 32 || Recap 
|- style="text-align:center; background:#fcf;"
| 45 || April 21 || Florida || 0–3 || Boston ||  || Rask (18–9–4) || Markstrom (6–13–1) || 17,565 || 13–26–6 || 32 || Recap
|- style="text-align:center; background:#cfc;"
| 46 || April 23 || N.Y. Rangers || 2–3 || Florida ||  || Markstrom (7–13–1) || Lundqvist (22–16–3) || 17,758 || 14–26–6 || 34 || Recap 
|- style="text-align:center; background:#fcf;"
| 47 || April 25 || Toronto || 4–0 || Florida ||  || Reimer (19–7–5) || Markstrom (7–14–1) || 16,484 || 14–27–6 || 34 || Recap 
|- style="text-align:center; background:#cfc;"
| 48 || April 27 || Florida || 5–3 || Tampa Bay ||  || Markstrom (8–14–1) || Lindback (10–10–1) || 19,204 || 15–27–6 || 36 || Recap 
|-

|-
|Legend:

Boldface text denotes a Panthers goalie.

Player statistics
Final stats 

Skaters

Goaltenders

†Denotes player spent time with another team before joining the Panthers.  Stats reflect time with the Panthers only.
‡Traded mid-season
Bold/italics denotes franchise record

Awards and records

Awards

Transactions 

The Panthers have been involved in the following transactions during the 2012–13 season.

Trades

Free agents acquired

Free agents lost

Claimed via waivers

Lost via waivers

Lost via retirement

Player signings

Draft picks

Florida Panthers' picks at the 2012 NHL Entry Draft, held in Pittsburgh, Pennsylvania on June 22 & 23, 2012. 

Draft Notes

 The Florida Panthers' second-round pick went to the Philadelphia Flyers as the result of a July 1, 2011, trade that sent Kris Versteeg to the Panthers in exchange for a 2012 third-round pick and this pick.
 The Florida Panthers' fifth-round pick went to the Dallas Stars as the result of a December 6, 2011, trade that sent Krys Barch and a 2012 sixth-round pick to the Panthers in exchange for Jake Hauswirth and this pick.
 The Dallas Stars' seventh-round pick went to the Florida Panthers as a result of a June 23, 2012, trade that sent a 2013 seventh-round pick to the Stars in exchange for this pick.
 The Florida Panthers' seventh-round pick went to the Chicago Blackhawks as the result of a June 27, 2011, trade that sent Tomas Kopecky to the Predators in exchange for this conditional pick (2012 if Panthers do not send seventh-round pick to Predators from earlier trade, else 2013).

See also 
 2012–13 NHL season

References

Florida Panthers seasons
F
F
2012 in sports in Florida
2013 in sports in Florida